Afrolicania is a genus of plant in family Chrysobalanaceae described as a genus in 1921. It contains only one known species, Afrolicania elaeosperma, native to western and central Africa from Liberia to West Congo.

References

Chrysobalanaceae
Monotypic Malpighiales genera
Flora of Africa